This article presents a list of the historical events and publications of Australian literature during 1965.

Major publications

Books 

 Thea Astley – The Slow Natives
 Clive Barry – Crumb Borne
 Nancy Cato – North West by South
 Don Charlwood – All the Green Year
 Catherine Gaskin – The File on Devlin
 Donald Horne – The Permit
 George Johnston – The Far Face of the Moon
 Thomas Keneally – The Fear
 Christopher Koch – Across the Sea Wall
 Eric Lambert – The Long White Night
 D'Arcy Niland – The Apprentices
 Randolph Stow – The Merry-Go-Round in the Sea
 George Turner – A Waste of Shame
 Morris West – The Ambassador

Short stories 

 Mena Kasmiri Abdullah and Ray Mathew – The Time of the Peacock: Stories
Damien Broderick – A Man Returned
 Peter Cowan – The Empty Street: Stories
 John K. Ewers – Modern Australian Short Stories (edited)
 Thelma Forshaw – "The Mateship Syndrome"
 Frank Hardy – The Yarns of Billy Borker
 Hal Porter – The Cats of Venice

Children's and Young Adult fiction 

 Nan Chauncy
 Panic at the Garage
 The Skewbald Pony
 Ruth Park
 The Muddle-Headed Wombat in the Treetops
 Ring for the Sorcerer
 Joan Phipson – Birkin
 Ivan Southall – Ash Road
 Eleanor Spence – The Year of the Currawong
 Kylie Tennant – Trail Blazers of the Air
 Colin Thiele – February Dragon
 Patricia Wrightson – Down to Earth

Poetry 

 Bruce Dawe – A Need of Similar Name
 Rosemary Dobson – Cock Crow : Poems
 Robert D. Fitzgerald – Forty Years' Poems
 A. D. Hope – "Ode on the Death of Pius the Twelfth"
 Geoffrey Lehmann & Les Murray – The Ilex Tree
 Les Murray – "Noonday Axeman"
 Vivian Smith – "At an Exhibition of Historical Paintings, Hobart"

Biography 

 Martin Boyd – Day of My Delight
 Norman Lindsay – Bohemians of the Bulletin

Drama 

 Patrick White – A Cheery Soul

Awards and honours

Literary

Children and Young Adult

Poetry

Births 

A list, ordered by date of birth (and, if the date is either unspecified or repeated, ordered alphabetically by surname) of births in 1965 of Australian literary figures, authors of written works or literature-related individuals follows, including year of death.

 25 March – Melina Marchetta, novelist
 29 December – Gideon Haigh, journalist and author

Unknown date

 Michael Farrell, poet
 Fiona McGregor, novelist
 Carrie Tiffany, novelist
 Christos Tsiolkas, novelist
 Charlotte Wood, novelist

Deaths 

A list, ordered by date of death (and, if the date is either unspecified or repeated, ordered alphabetically by surname) of deaths in 1965 of Australian literary figures, authors of written works or literature-related individuals follows, including year of birth.

 28 January – Gertrude Hart, novelist (born 1873)
 29 January – T. Harri Jones, Welsh poet who emigrated to Australia
 17 May – Duke Tritton, poet and folksinger
 28 May – P. R. Stephensen, writer, publisher and political activist
 3 September –  Brian Fitzpatrick, author, historian and journalist
 2 November – 
Lex Banning, poet (born 1921 with cerebral palsy and unable to speak clearly or to write with a pen)
H.V. Evatt, judge, parliamentarian and writer

See also 
 1965 in Australia
1965 in literature
1965 in poetry
 List of years in Australian literature
List of years in literature

References

 
Australian literature by year
20th-century Australian literature
1965 in literature